This list of tallest structures in the Middle East ranks structures and buildings in the Middle East by height. According to the Council on tall buildings and urban habitat 22 cities in 10 Middle Eastern countries have at least one structure above 150 m.

Tallest structures and buildings

Tallest structures by country

References

Middle East
Middle East-related lists